Riley Dolezal (born November 16, 1985) is an American track and field athlete who competes in the javelin throw. He now works at Cheney middle school as a gym teacher

Personal and Prep
Born in Stanley, North Dakota, Dolezal attended Stanley High School. Outside of throwing Dolezal enjoys hunting, welding, boating, auto repair, Motorsport, video and yard games. Riley Dolezal grew up in a town of 1200 and taught himself how to throw javelin his junior year of high school. A multi-sport athlete, he had an opportunity to play football and baseball in college.

NCAA
Dolezal attended North Dakota State University from 2005 to 2009 and competed in the javelin.

Professional
Dolezal teaches middle school physical education and works as an assistant coach at North Dakota State University.

At the 2013 USA Outdoor Track and Field Championships Dolezal had a startling breakthrough. This moved him up to eighth on the all-time American lists and brought him the national title, finishing ahead of reigning NCAA champion Sam Humphreys.

Seasonal bests by year
2008 – 67.89
2009 – 69.78
2010 – 69.54
2011 – 68.54
2012 – 72.60
2013 – 83.50
2014 – 79.27
2015 – 81.16
2016 – 80.42
2017 – 81.77

References

External links
 
 
 
 
 
 Riley Dolezal at University of North Dakota
 Riley Dolezal at All-Athletics.com
 
 Riley Dolezal at AthleteBiz.us

Living people
1985 births
American male javelin throwers
People from Mountrail County, North Dakota
North Dakota State University alumni
Athletes (track and field) at the 2015 Pan American Games
World Athletics Championships athletes for the United States
Pan American Games medalists in athletics (track and field)
Pan American Games silver medalists for the United States
USA Outdoor Track and Field Championships winners
Medalists at the 2015 Pan American Games